Robert Asse (17 August 1894 – 27 April 1932) was a French racing cyclist. He started 10 Tours of France during his career but never completed any.

Grand Tour general classification results timeline
Source:

References

External links
 

1894 births
French male cyclists
1932 deaths